Zaherabad may refer to:
 Zaherabad, Razavi Khorasan
 Zaherabad, Sistan and Baluchestan